Lago Huachi Airport  is an airport serving the lakeside village of Lago Huachi in the Beni Department of Bolivia. The runway extends north from the village.

See also

Transport in Bolivia
List of airports in Bolivia

References

External links
OpenStreetMap - Lago Huachi
OurAirports - Lago Huachi
FallingRain - Lago Huachi Airport
HERE/Nokia - Lago Huachi

Airports in Beni Department